Hamblain-les-Prés is a commune in the Pas-de-Calais department in the Hauts-de-France region of France.

Geography
The A26 autoroute passes by the village about half a mile away.

Population

Places of interest
 The church of St.Michel, rebuilt along with the entire village, after World War I.

See also
Communes of the Pas-de-Calais department

References

Hamblainlespres